Benjamin Jack Hinchliffe (born 25 September 1997) is an English semi-professional footballer who plays for Northern Counties East League Premier Division side Barton Town as a forward. He began his career with Championship side Hull City.

Club career

Hull City 
Hinchliffe joined Hull City at the age of 14 and signed a professional deal in May 2017. On 22 August 2017, he made his debut in a 2–0 EFL Cup defeat to Doncaster Rovers.

Gainsborough Trinity 
Hinchcliffe joined Gainsborough Trinity on 16 March 2018 on loan until the end of April 2018.

Barton Town 
Following his release from Hull, Hinchcliffe joined Barton Town. In the 2019/20 season, he was the club's top scorer with 19 goals in 32 appearances.

Statistics

References 

1997 births
Living people
Footballers from Kingston upon Hull
English footballers
Association football forwards
Hull City A.F.C. players
Gainsborough Trinity F.C. players
Northern Counties East Football League players
Barton Town F.C. players